The Lorelei is a 1927 German silent drama film directed by Wolfgang Neff and starring Renate Brausewetter, Trude Hesterberg, and Lotte Lorring.

The film's sets were designed by Willi Herrmann.

Cast
In alphabetical order

References

Bibliography

External links

1927 films
1927 drama films
Films of the Weimar Republic
German silent feature films
German drama films
Films directed by Wolfgang Neff
German black-and-white films
Silent drama films
1920s German films
1920s German-language films